John Mark Zimmerman (born 1956) is a retired American Anglican bishop. He was the first diocesan bishop of the Anglican Diocese of the Southwest, which has jurisdiction in west Texas, New Mexico and Mexico in the Anglican Church in North America.

Early life, education, and early ministry

Zimmerman was born in 1956 to an Episcopal priest. After completing college, he met his future wife, Cynthia, and they worked overseas, teaching English in Oman. Zimmerman received a call to ministry and attended Trinity School for Ministry, graduating with an M.Div. in 1986. Early in his ordained career, he spent nine years as a priest in New Mexico.

From 1999 to 2008, Zimmerman was rector of St. Francis-in-the-Fields Episcopal Church in Somerset, Pennsylvania, growing it from a 30-member congregation to nearly 100 in Sunday attendance and debt-free status for the first time in its history. In 2008―the same year that the majority of the Episcopal Diocese of Pittsburgh voted to leave the episcopal church, thus forming the Anglican Diocese of Pittsburgh―Zimmerman announced to the congregation that he was leaving the Episcopal Church. Eighty percent of St. Francis' members followed him, and the new congregation, called Somerset Anglican Fellowship, left its building and began meeting at a local mall. In 2011, Somerset Anglican Fellowship purchased the former St. Paul Presbyterian Church in Somerset and relocated there. Zimmerman launched a Young Life chapter in Somerset and started a Spanish-speaking outreach service.

Episcopacy

The newly formed Diocese of the Southwest elected Zimmerman as its first diocesan bishop in 2014. He was consecrated at the Church of St. Clement in El Paso by Archbishop Robert Duncan on February 28, 2014. The diocese was small, with just 14 congregations spread across a large and remote geographic area. 

During his episcopacy, the diocese grew to 22 congregations. In 2016, Zimmerman joined fellow ACNA Bishops Eric Menees, Keith Andrews, Kevin Bond Allen, and Todd Hunter to streamline the ordination process in western U.S. ACNA dioceses, with a joint exam and a joint examining board that would allow clergy ordained under the standards to serve in any participating diocese. In November 2019, Zimmerman ordained Farhid Adabache to the priesthood in Fresnillo, Mexico. Adabache was the first Mexican national to be ordained by the ACNA to serve a Mexican congregation. 

In 2020, Zimmerman began winding down his episcopal duties after accepting a call to serve for a two-year period as a half-time bishop-in-residence and interim rector at Christ Church Phoenix in the Diocese of Western Anglicans. Zimmerman currently serves as a volunteer bishop in the Diocese of Churches for the Sake of Others.

References

Living people
Bishops of the Anglican Church in North America
1956 births
Anglican realignment people